Atlantic Ballroom is the fifth studio album by Waldeck, released in 2018. The album is latin and electro swing-influenced and was co-written by Waldeck and Patrizia Ferrara. It includes an English arrangement of "Illusions", which was featured in Italian on Waldeck's previous album, Gran Paradiso.

Track listing

Personnel

Klaus Waldeck – performer, producer, composer, piano, keyboard, organ
Buerowinkler – graphics
Ditz Fejer - photography

References 

2018 albums
Klaus Waldeck albums